Bucculatrix ceanothiella is a moth in the family Bucculatricidae. The species was first described in 1918 by Annette Frances Braun. It is found in North America, where it has been recorded from California.

The wingspan is about 6.5 mm. The forewings are white, dusted with minutely brown-tipped scales. The markings are formed by lines and aggregations of brown- and black-tipped scales. The hindwings are pale silvery grey. Adults have been recorded on wing from February to May, in July and from September to October.

The larvae feed on Ceanothus species. They mine the leaves of their host plant. The mine has the form of a small irregular brownish blotch. Older larvae live freely, feeding on the lower surface of the leaf leaving the upper epidermis intact. Pupation takes place in a white cocoon.

References

Natural History Museum Lepidoptera generic names catalog

Bucculatricidae
Moths described in 1918
Moths of North America
Taxa named by Annette Frances Braun